Trade Union Congress Party is a party-list in the Philippines, set up by the Trade Union Congress of the Philippines as its electoral wing. The party contested the 2004 legislative elections, mustering 201,396 votes nationwide (1.58%). The list failed to win any seat. The Supreme Court declared TUCP, as well as a few other party-list organizations, as winners in the 2007 legislative elections by virtue of the Philippine Constitution.

Electoral performance 

Note: Competed in 2001 as Trade Union Congress of the Philippines.

Party-list nominees 
For the 2019 elections, only the first nominee of the party won a seat, Raymond Democrito C. Mendoza. He is one of the 70 representatives who prevented the renewal of the ABS-CBN franchise at the committee level thus making sure the bill did not reach the plenary.

References

Party-lists represented in the House of Representatives of the Philippines
Labor parties in the Philippines
Left-wing parties in the Philippines